The Battery Park City Ferry Terminal, is a passenger ferry terminal in Battery Park City, Manhattan, serving ferries along the Hudson River in New York City and northeastern New Jersey. It provides slips to ferries, water taxis, and sightseeing boats in the Port of New York and New Jersey.

The terminal is primarily served by commuter ferries operated by NY Waterway, which refers to the terminal as Brookfield Place, and Liberty Landing Ferry, which refers to it as World Financial Center. Both of these names refer to Brookfield Place, a shopping center and office building complex formerly known as the World Financial Center. NYC Ferry also uses the terminal for its St. George route.

The floating dock is moored at the foot of Vesey Street, consisting of four bow-loading slips and two side loading points to serve an additional slip.

History
Regular ferry service between lower Manhattan and the Village of Communipaw (in today's Jersey City) dates back to at least 1661 with the founding of the Communipaw ferry during the Dutch colonial period. The Jersey City Ferry began service in July 1764 between Paulus Hook to Mesier's dock, which was located at the foot of Courtland Street. Both ferries continued to operate into the 19th and 20th centuries and docked at Liberty Street Ferry Terminal and the Cortland Street Ferry Depot respectively. When these ferry slips were closed in the 1950s and 1960s they were demolished and the slips were filled in to create Battery Park City.

In 1986 NY Waterway restarted ferry service across the Hudson River. A ferry slip opened at Battery Park City in 1989 with the intentions of reducing rush-hour crowds on the PATH trains serving the World Trade Center station.

Port Authority of New York and New Jersey first commissioned the construction of the current terminal in 2000, but plans were put on hold following the September 11 attacks.

A 1,200-ton hull was constructed in Corpus Christi, Texas and was transported to Pier 39 in the Sunset Park neighborhood of Brooklyn in 2006, where the remainder of the terminal was constructed. At a total cost of $50 million, the terminal was then floated up to Battery Park City and opened March 18, 2009. The terminal reconstruction project was named Best Public Works Project by New York Construction News.

Since June 2013, ferries using the terminal, in accordance with the previously disregarded Rule 34(a)(i) (which prescribes maneuvering and warning signals), sound their horns to indicate their actions, creating what many local residents perceive as noise pollution.

Service

Ferry
NY Waterway is the largest operator of services in the terminal. It serves Port Imperial in Weehawken and 14th Street in Hoboken during weekday rush hours, and Hoboken Terminal and Paulus Hook Ferry Terminal 7 days a week.

Liberty Landing Ferry provides ferry service to Liberty Landing Marina in Jersey City with an intermediate stop at Warren Street. The service is operated by Hornblower Cruises, which also operates NYC Ferry and ferries to the Statue of Liberty National Monument.

Goldman Sachs commissions two ferries to run between the terminal and Paulus Hook Ferry Terminal, connecting its offices in Battery Park City and Jersey City, with service beginning February 19, 2013. York and Jersey are operated by NY Waterway, flying the flag of the ferry service but not bearing its name or logo. The ferries are available to both employees and the general public since, by law, ferries utilizing the public terminal must be available to the public.

Seastreak operates service to Monmouth County, NJ

Service on the St. George route of the NYC Ferry system began in August 2021. Battery Park City is the intermediate station between West Midtown and St. George Terminals.

Bus
SeaStreak operates a rush hour shuttle bus to Pier 11/Wall Street for connecting service to Atlantic Highlands and Highlands on the Raritan Bayshore. The Dowton Connection loop stops nearby the terminal. New York City Transit bus routes  and  stop on the nearby corner of Vesey Street and North End Avenue.

See also

List of ferries across the Hudson River to New York City
Liberty Street Ferry Terminal
Cortlandt Street Ferry Depot

References

External links

Port of New York and New Jersey
Ferry transportation in New York City
Transit hubs serving New Jersey
Battery Park City
Ferry terminals in Manhattan